Páramos may refer to:

 Páramos (comarca), a comarca in Spain
 Páramos, Venezuela, a region in the Cordillera de Mérida, Venezuela

See also
 Páramo (disambiguation)